

Events calendar

+04